Forsvaret or Försvaret may refer to:
 Danish Defence, the military of Denmark
 Norwegian Armed Forces, the military of Norway
 Swedish Armed Forces, the military of Sweden
 Finnish Defence Forces, the military of Finland

See also
 Försvarsmakten (disambiguation)